Stuart is a rural coastal suburb in the City of Townsville, Queensland, Australia.

Geography 
Stuart is bounded to the north-east by the Coral Sea. The North Coast railway line forms the western boundary with the Stuart railway station serving the suburb. The Bruce Highway passes from the south-east to the north-west through the suburb. The Flinders Highway passes from the south-west to its junction with the Bruce Highway. Most of this large suburb is undeveloped land with the developed land mostly used for infrastructure and industrial purposes. There is a small amount of residential development.

It takes its name from a former railway siding on the North Coast railway line, which in turn was named after Joseph Partington, a local brickmaker.

History
The suburb takes its name from the railway station, which was originally called Ayr Junction railway station in 1902, then Stewarts Creek railway station in 1938 and then Stuart railway station in 1939. It is thought that Stewart was just a temporary misspelling of Stuart and that the intention was to name the area after the first district surveyor appointed in 1865, Clarendon Stuart (1833-1912).

Stewart's Creek Provisional School opened on 18 May 1891, becoming Stewart's Creek State School in 1901. In 1939 it was renamed Stuart State School. It closed on 31 December 2013.

In December 1942, two classrooms of the Stuart State School on the outskirts of Townsville were used by the Army as the main Army Signals Communication Centre in North Queensland. The unit later moved to a concrete bunker at Roseneath.

Heritage listings
Stuart has a number of heritage-listed sites, including:
 Centenary Drive, off Dwyer Street: Stewart's Creek Gaol (the historic buildings within the present Townsville Correction Centre)
 Off Stuart Drive (now in Wulguru): former Operations and Signals Bunker
 523 Stuart Drive: St Brigid's Church

Facilities 
Infrastructure in Stuart includes:
 Townsville Correctional Centre
 Stuart landfill and waste transfer station
Industries in Stuart include:
 Mount Stuart Power Station
 Sun Metals Zinc Refinery

Education 
There are no schools in Stuart. The nearest primary schools are Townsville South State School in neighbouring South Townsville to the north-west, Oonooba State School in Idalia to the west, and Wulguru State School in neighbouring Wulguru to the south-west. The nearest secondary school is William Ross State High School in Annandale to the west.

References

External links

 

 
Suburbs of Townsville